Sokola - is a Polish Coat of Arms. It was used by several szlachta families in the times of the Polish–Lithuanian Commonwealth.

History

Blazon

Notable bearers

Notable bearers of this Coat of Arms include:
 Jakób Gałczeński
 Marcin Gałczyński
 Józef, Piotr w okowach, Ignacy Gałczyński
 Wojciech-Woś (Gałczeński) Gałczyński
 Zbigniew Sokola-Maniecki

See also

 Polish heraldry
 Heraldry
 Coat of Arms
 List of Polish nobility coats of arms

Sources 
 Dynastic Genealogy 
 Ornatowski.com 
 Słownik genealogiczny - leksykon

External links 
  Sokola Coat of Arms and bearers. 

Polish coats of arms